= C2HN =

The molecular formula C_{2}HN (molar mass: 39.04 g/mol, exact mass: 39.0108 u) may refer to:

- Ethynylazanide
- 1-Azacycloprop-2-yne
- 2-Deuterioethenylideneazanide
